Herbert Barrett Curteis (1793–1847) was an English Whig politician.

Life

He was born on 19 June 1793 the eldest son of Edward Jeremiah Curteis (MP for Sussex in 1820) and his wife Mary Barrett, daughter of Rev Stephen Barrett of Kildwick in Yorkshire. He was educated at Westminster College then studied at Christ's College, Oxford.

He sat in the House of Commons of the United Kingdom for 13 years between 1830 and 1837.  He was  Member of Parliament (MP) for Sussex from 1830 to 1832, for East Sussex, and for Rye, Sussex, from 1841 until his death in 1847.

Curteis was educated at Westminster School and Christ Church, Oxford, where he matriculated in 1812, and graduated B.A. in 1815.

He died on 13 December 1847 and is buried in Wartling, Sussex with a tomb sculpted by Thomas Gaffin.Dictionary of British Sculptors 1660-1851 by Rupert Gunnis p.160

Family

In 1821 he married Sarah Mascall daughter and heir of Robert Mascall, and through her inherited the estate of Peasmarsh in Sussex after her death in 1825. They had one son, born in 1823. A daughter, Charlotte Ellen Curteis died in 1861 and is buried in Wartling with a monument by Thomas Denman.

References

External links

1793 births
1847 deaths
People educated at Westminster School, London
Alumni of Christ Church, Oxford
Members of the Parliament of the United Kingdom for English constituencies
Whig (British political party) MPs for English constituencies
UK MPs 1830–1831
UK MPs 1831–1832
UK MPs 1832–1835
UK MPs 1835–1837
UK MPs 1841–1847